Cross Kauwa (sometimes referred to simply as Kauwa) is a town in the northeastern Nigerian state of Borno, east of the town of Kukawa.  It is located within the Kukawa Local Government Area.

The town is located along a road that runs from Baga to the east (formerly at the shore of Lake Chad) and to Kukawa to the west.   Another road leads south to Monguno.  According to a 2007 report in The Sun (Nigeria), it is about an hour's drive from Monguno to Cross Kauwa.

Maina Maaji Lawan, a former governor of Borno State, and later a National Senator, was born in the town.

References

Populated places in Borno State